Rammanahalli  is a Town and a suburb of Mysore in the Mysuru metropolitan area  of Karnataka, India. It is located in the Mysore taluk of Mysore district. In November 2020, Kadakola was upgraded from a Gram Panchayat to a Town Panchayat and a gazetted notification was passed on November 26th 2020.  The notification combines Rammanahalli GP villages, Nadanahalli and Alanahalli (outside of Ring Road) of Alanahalli GP, Hanchya and Sathagalli villages of Hanchya GP, covering  a total area of  22.81 sq. km. The combined population of the town according to 2011 census was 20,804.

Demographics
According to census 2011,  combined population of the town according to 2011 census was 20,804. Population breakdown is given below.

Localities 

 Rammanahalli
 Sathgalli
 Nadanahalli
 Hanchya
 Alanahalli
 KBL Layout
 Nandini Layout
 Buguthagalli

Landmarks 

 Sathgalli Bus Station
 VTU Regional Center
 Vidya Vikas Engineering College
 Jalmahal Resort
 Jnanasarovara International School
 Alanahalli Police Station
 Sathgalli Police Station

Gallery

See also
 Districts of Karnataka

References

External links

Villages in Mysore district